Rommaninat Park or spelt Romaneenart Park, commonly known as Khuk Kao (คุกเก่า, lit: "old prison") is a public park in Bangkok. Located 
between Siriphong and Maha Chai Roads, Samran Rat Subdistrict, Phra Nakhon District between Giant Swing, Wat Suthat and Sala Chalermkrung Royal Theatre. The total area is about 29 rai (round about 11 acres).

The park is located on the former site of Klong Prem Prison (เรือนจำคลองเปรม), built on the royal initiative of King Chulalongkorn (Rama V) in 1890, later in 1972 renamed to Bangkok Remand Prison (เรือนจำพิเศษกรุงเทพ).  Crown Prince Vajiralongkorn (later King Maha Vajiralongkorn (Rama X)) presided over the official opening of Rommaninat Park and Corrections Museum on August 17, 1999.

Certified guide dogs are allowed in this park. 

This park also serves as terminal of BMTA's bus line 42.

See also
Bangkok Corrections Museum – museum within the park
Saranrom Park – nearby public park

References

External links
Official Thai Website

Phra Nakhon district
Parks in Bangkok
1992 establishments in Thailand